The 2005–06 LSU Tigers basketball team represented Louisiana State University in the Southeastern Conference (SEC) during the 2005–06 NCAA Division I men's basketball season.  The team was coached by John Brady and played their home games at Pete Maravich Assembly Center in Baton Rouge, Louisiana.

Recruiting class

Roster

Schedule

|-
!colspan=9 style=| Regular season

|-
!colspan=9 style=| SEC Tournament

|-

|-
!colspan=9 style=| NCAA Tournament

Rankings

*AP does not release post-NCAA Tournament rankings^Coaches did not release a Week 2 poll.

NBA draft

References

LSU Tigers basketball seasons
Lsu
NCAA Division I men's basketball tournament Final Four seasons
LSU
LSU
LSU